The Richmond Night Market is an annual night market held during the summer months in Richmond, British Columbia in Canada. It runs on weekends and it's currently held near Bridgeport Station of the Canada Line next to River Rock Casino Resort.

Founded by entrepreneur Raymond Cheung, the Richmond Night Market has become an international success story, garnering headlines in the New York Times on multiple occasions.

It was first held at Continental Centre on Cambie Road in 2000, and at Lansdowne Centre (then known as Lansdowne Park Shopping Centre) for the next two years before relocating to the former home of the Bridgepoint Market in 2003. It was then relocated to a waterfront property on Vulcan Way behind The Home Depot, where it shattered records and caused lineups that extended from miles into Vancouver. But that success, as it had many times before, proved to be a headache, as the landlord at Vulcan Way sought a massive increase to the annual lease. When Cheung declined, the market was on the verge of being cancelled. The competing Summer Night Market, organized by Paul Cheung (no relation to founder Raymond Cheung) was able to secure the lease to the Vulcan Way location and ran it there for several years. But Paul Cheung was unable to replicate the success that Raymond Cheung had achieved, and after a court battle over the event's name, Paul Cheung eventually closed the Summer Night Market. Richmond's large immigrant population had already provided a strong Asian influence on the night markets.

The Richmond Night Market has been appreciated by locals and tourists for getting people together, offering good ethnic food, and providing entertainment. According to Tourism Richmond, a non-profit organization promoting Richmond to both residents and tourists, the night market is a "must see" tourist attraction. Events such as fundraisers by the Richmond Fire Department are often held at the night market.

History

The Richmond Night Market, founded by entrepreneur Raymond Cheung, was first held in the year 2000 in the parking lot at the Continental Centre in Richmond, British Columbia, Canada, where it ran for only a couple of months during the summer. But in only a short time, it became a victim of its own success: so many people came to the weekend market, that tenants at Continental Centre complained to the landlord about the impact it was having on their businesses as well as on parking availability and traffic in the surrounding roadways.

In 2001, Cheung found a new home for the Richmond Night Market, which not only offered more space for the growing number of retail and food booths but gave the market massive visibility in the heart of Richmond, at Lansdowne Park Shopping Centre on No. 3 Road, a road running north-south through the heart of the city's downtown core.

In 2002, the Richmond Night Market returned for a second year to Lansdowne Park Shopping Centre, where its reputation continued to grow. But again, it became a victim of its own success, as shopkeepers in the mall complained about the market's impact on their business.

So, the night market had to find a new home, and so in 2003, it was in a clearing next to the soon-to-be-demolished BridgePoint Market, which would later become a familiar spot to those who frequent the annual market.

By 2003, it was moved to Lansdowne Centre to accommodate its growth. As attendance continued to increase, it moved again to the present site of the River Rock Casino Resort and finally to River Rd. Over 30,000 people visit the night market each night.

At its peak, the Richmond Night Market had over 400 booths selling mostly Asian cuisine, merchandise, and entertainment. Entrance to the market was free, though parking on site near the entrance can cost as high as $5.50 for the evening. Currently, year 2012, there is free parking and only a small admission fee. The merchandise sold at the night market is of a lower price point than traditional retail stores and primarily imported from Asia.

In October 2007, the Richmond Night Market's lease on Vulcan Way expired. The landlord and Target Event Production Ltd. were unable to negotiate a new lease, primarily due to a rent increase. Target Event Production Ltd. attempted to find an alternative location, within Richmond, to host the night market for 2008. However, they were not able to find a venue in time, in Richmond or anywhere else within Metro Vancouver.  It was then announced through a press release that the Richmond Night Market was canceled.

A new location was found for the return of the Richmond Night Market for 2010. However, due to cost concerns, plans for the new location were dropped.

In May 2012, they made a comeback with the night market on from May 18 to October 8, with a new location next to SkyTrain Canada Lines' Bridgeport Station and River Rock Casino.

Developments
By March 2008, a new location for the Richmond Night Market had not been found. Discussions had been taking place with other cities and municipalities, but it was hoped that the market would remain in Richmond, BC. In April 2008, Target Events Production Ltd. issued a news release canceling the event for 2008 and stated it would attempt to find an alternative location for the following year.

Another promoter, not affiliated with the Richmond Night Market, hosted the night market in 2008 and has continued to do so. The succeeding promoter, Lions Communication Inc. renamed the event from Richmond Night Market to "Summer Night Market". After a hearing at Richmond City Hall on 20 May 2008, the Summer Night Market was granted a permit for two-years operation at the Vulcan Way location. The first season took place between May 30 and 5 October 2008. The festival for 2009 started on 15 May 2009 and ended on 4 October 2009. The festival for 2010 started on May 21, in order to coincide with start of the May long weekend and is scheduled to finish on October 5.

In early May 2008, the site was subject to suspicious vandalism which caused Lions Communication Inc. to power the night market with emergency generators while electrical repairs estimated at $100,000 were made. The main service pole was cut down and the fuses and wiring were ripped out. The RCMP had investigated, and no charges were laid.

Lions Communications Inc. has previous experience in organizing various night markets both in Richmond and Vancouver, notably the first night market of its kind for Richmond in the 1998 Continental Square Mid-Autumn Festival along with the Chinese New Year Night Market at Lansdowne Centre which ran for 6 consecutive years starting from 1999. This company also includes the core operators behind Paradise Entertainment, a company which has organized events such as the Molson Indy opening ceremonies, Mid-Autumn Festival 1995 and Chinese New Year celebrations in 1998 at the Plaza of Nations in Vancouver. This company has also stated that they will reduce parking costs compared to previous years and improve access to the night market site.

In October 2009, Raymond Cheung stated a new location was found and will be located in New Westminster, BC. Cheung had previously promoted the night market at its future location, as being the 'largest in North America' when it opens for 2010. The night market was planned to run from May 21 until October 11, operating Friday, Saturday, Sunday and holiday evenings. Target Entertainment Inc. had formed a partnership with Starlight Casino for the event. The planned area offered 1000 free parking spots. It was expected the night market would draw around 10,000 visitors per week and two million over the course of the year, said Darren Harding, executive general manager of the casino. However, before the night market can be permitted to open, approval from New Westminster City Council was needed, which is also requesting a traffic impact study be completed.

On 26 January 2010, more than 60 people attended the Queensborough Residents Association where plans for the Richmond Night Market were discussed.
Residents expressed concerns over the market traffic and parking.  The association formed a community advisory group to further investigate the issues. Queensborough residents also raised questions about how potential crime, litter, and lighting from the market would be dealt with.

Organizers for the Richmond Night Market and Summer Night Market had planned, in 2010, to hold two separate competing night markets. However, on 16 April 2010, a few weeks prior to the planned re-opening at the Queensborough location, Starlight Casino gave notice to New Westminster's city planning department that they were formally withdrawing their application for a temporary use permit to host the night market. A joint press release from Raymond Cheung of Target Events Production Ltd. and Starlight Casino followed announcing the cancellation to select media by email on April 19. Starlight Casino general manager Tim Barnett explained that it was due to the scaling down of vendors from 300 to 225, increasing operating costs from policing, providing traffic management plans, and ensuring additional parking for vendors, had made operating the night market adjacent to the casino "no longer sustainable". In the end only the Summer Night Market in Richmond was able to open on schedule for the 2010 Victoria Day Long Weekend.

A new temporary home has yet to be found and might not be ready until 2011. Besides the location in New Westminster, Cheung has suggested returning the Richmond Night Market to central Richmond as a possibility.

Lawsuit

Previously, Raymond Cheung of Target Event Production Ltd. was hoping to continue his night market at a different location in 2009 and had filed a lawsuit against Paul Cheung (no relation) of Lions Communication Inc., alleging trademark infringement over the name of the night market and copyright infringement on the vendor application forms. Paul Cheung said the allegations are without merit, stating night markets are "not an exclusive concept".

Between May 12–15 and 19–21, and June 10–11, 2009, a hearing in Federal Court occurred regarding copyright infringement between Target Event Production Ltd. and Paul Cheung and Lions Communication Inc.

On 11 January 2010, judgment was passed regarding copyright infringement. The court found that the plaintiff (TARGET EVENT PRODUCTION LTD.) had acquired rights in four trademarks: RICHMOND NIGHT MARKET, RICHMOND NIGHT MARKET SUMMER FESTIVAL and Chinese characters for each of these. The trademarks were originally merely descriptive, but by January 2007 they were valid trademarks because they enjoyed substantial goodwill and had acquired distinctiveness in association with the plaintiff and the location of the market. However, the Court also concluded that the distinctiveness was not durable, and the trademarks lost their distinctiveness and associated goodwill when the Plaintiff failed to open another night market in 2009.

The court concluded that the defendants (PAUL CHEUNG AND LIONS COMMUNICATIONS INC.) had failed to adequately distance themselves from Target's former business when trying to take advantage of the opportunity presented by Target's cessation of services. As a result, the Court found both copyright infringement and passing off, thus a ruling in favour of Target Event Production Ltd.

Damages in the amount of $15,000.00 plus costs and interest was awarded to the plaintiff, for which the Lions Communication Inc. and Paul Cheung are both liable to pay.

Lions Communications Inc. is currently appealing the Federal Court's January decision. Paul Cheung, while okay with the name change, does not believe the floor plan (which details where vendor booths and the stage are to be set up), can be considered "intellectual property" and subject to copyright.

Despite the name change, Raymond Cheung also threatened to sue media outlets that used the words "Richmond Summer Night Market" in news stories or advertisements.

After 9 years of operation, the Summer Night Market has been in the Vulcan Way location in 2008 rebranded as "Illumination Summer Night Market" ran from May to September 2017. In March 2018, the Illumination Summer Night Market was permanently cancelled for summer 2018 and Lions Communications Inc. ceased operations after the season.

Footnotes

External links
Richmond Night Market official site
Summer Night Market official site

Night markets in Canada
Richmond, British Columbia
Retail markets in Canada